The Sweden goodwill lunar displays are two commemorative plaques consisting of tiny fragments of Moon specimens brought back with the Apollo 11 and Apollo 17 lunar missions. These plaques were given to the people of Sweden by United States President Richard Nixon as goodwill gifts.

Description

Apollo 11

Apollo 17

History 

The Apollo 17 display is at the National Museum of Science and Technology.

The Apollo 11 plaque display given to Sweden was reported missing by the Swedish Museum of Natural History in Stockholm on September 7, 2002.

See also
 List of Apollo lunar sample displays

References

Further reading

External links

 Partial list of Apollo  11, 12, 14, 15, 16, and 17 sample locations, NASA Johnson Space Center

Stolen and missing moon rocks
Sweden–United States relations
Tourist attractions in Stockholm